University Hospital Heidelberg is a university hospital in Heidelberg, Germany and is with 1,991 beds one of the largest medical centers in the country. It is closely linked to Heidelberg University Medical School (Heidelberg University Faculty of Medicine) which was founded in 1388 and is thus the oldest within the Federal Republic of Germany.

Patient care 
Over 1 million patients per year are treated at the University Hospital Heidelberg. The hospital is especially renowned for the treatment of cancer. A recent innovation in the care of cancer patient is the foundation of the National Center of Tumor Diseases (NCT) in cooperation with German Cancer Research Center (DKFZ). The goal of NCT is an interdisciplinary collaboration between various clinical and basic science disciplines and the fast implementation of new and innovative therapeutic procedures. A good example for the Heidelberg's leading position in innovative cancer research and treatment is HIT (heavy ion therapy). HIT utilizes scanned beams of heavy ions, like carbon ions, and is thought to be superior in the treatment of some cancers compared to normal photon radiation. The new facility at University Hospital Heidelberg is unique in the world. The HIT radiation beam is directed by a 600 metric ton gantry which is rotated to focus the beam.

Research 
Close ties exist between it, the University Hospital and different research institutions in Heidelberg, e.g. German Cancer Research Center, Max Planck Institute for Medical Research and European Molecular Biology Laboratory.

Medical education 
Heidelberg University medical degree program, two years of basic science, followed by the first of the two steps of the German medical licensing examination, and four years of clinical studies, has undergone a fundamental reform in 2001: From 2001 on, all medical students at Heidelberg University, University Hospital Heidelberg (as opposed to the Heidelberg University Faculty of Medicine in Mannheim) pursue a reformed six-year-long course named "HeiCuMed" ("Heidelberger Curriculum Medicinale"). This degree course is an adapted version of the Harvard Medical School curriculum. Undergraduate, graduate and postgraduate programs of Heidelberg University Medical School have played a fundamental role in Heidelberg being awarded  "University of Excellence" status by the German Universities Excellence Initiative. There are currently over 4000 students enrolled.

Notable researchers and physicians affiliated with the Research Cluster Heidelberg in recent time
Markus Büchler, surgeon, professor of surgery at Heidelberg University, renowned for pioneering works in surgery of pancreas,
Hugo Katus, cardiologist, professor of medicine at Heidelberg University, developed the Troponin T test (biochemical detection of a myocardial infarction),
Bert Sakmann (Nobel Prize in Physiology or Medicine, 1997), professor at Heidelberg University and an Emeritus Scientific Member of the Max Planck Institute for Medical Research in Heidelberg,
Harald zur Hausen (Nobel Prize in Physiology or Medicine, 2008), from 1983 until 2003 served as a chairman and member of the scientific advisory board of the German Cancer Research Center in Heidelberg and professor of medicine at Heidelberg University.

History of the hospital
 1386: Foundation of the Universität Heidelberg by Elector Palatine Ruprecht I.
 1388: Heidelberg School of Medicine commences education
 1899: For the first time women are allowed to study Medicine in Heidelberg

See also 
List of university hospitals
Heidelberg University

References

External links 
 Heidelberg University Hospital's Website for International Patients
 Heidelberg University Hospital German Website

Heidelberg University Hospital
Hospitals established in the 14th century
Heidelberg University
Buildings and structures in Heidelberg
Medical and health organisations based in Baden-Württemberg